Regional elections were held in several regions of Italy during 2008. These included:

Friuli-Venezia Giulia on 13 and 14 April
Sicily on 13 and 14 April
Aosta Valley on 25 May
Trentino-Alto Adige on 26 October and 9 November
Abruzzo on 14 and 15 December

Elections in Italian regions
2008 elections in Italy